Poshti is a backrest cushion upholstered with rug fragments. It is a traditional piece of furniture and part of the Iranian culture as well as Afghan culture. Similar in appearance to a pillow but sturdier in material, poshti can have a square or rectangular shape. It is most commonly a one-piece item placed against the wall, but can come in two identical pieces as well, with one item placed on the floor as a mattress.

In traditional family gatherings such as Yalda, a set of poshtis were placed around a korsi and everyone would sit on the floor leaning against a poshti. Poshti is still sometimes used alongside modern furniture in Iran, however with changing lifestyles, it is becoming a decorative piece.

See also 
 Divan (furniture)
 Ottoman (furniture)

References

External links 
 A poshti from Iranian Balochistan at Indianapolis Museum of Art

Furniture
Seats
Iranian culture
Persian culture